Drew Goldberg (born May 24, 1991), otherwise known by his online alias, Drew Binsky, is an American travel blogger and vlogger who has visited every country in the world. Binsky documents his travels on his YouTube channel and other social media accounts. He holds the Guinness World Record for the fastest time to pack a suitcase. Until 2021, he also held the record for the Most (12) UNESCO World Heritage Site visits in 24 hours, a record now set at 23.

On October 29, 2021, Binsky visited Saudi Arabia, completing his feat of visiting every United Nations recognized country on Earth. As of 2021, his videos have received more than 4 billion views across his social media channels with more than 9 million followers.

Early life and education 
Binsky was born Drew Goldberg in Dallas, Texas and grew up in Scottsdale, Arizona. "Binsky" was a nickname given to him by his family, of Jewish German origin. His first ever trip overseas was to Israel in 2009. He attended the University of Wisconsin–Madison, graduating in 2013 with degrees in economics and entrepreneurship. During his third year in university, he entered into a study abroad program in Prague, Czech Republic. He studied there for 1 semester, and traveled to more than 20 countries across Europe, at which time he decided he would make a living out of traveling.

Career 
After college, Binsky took a job teaching English in Seoul, South Korea. He spent 18 months there, and traveled to 20 countries in Asia during that time. He quit his teaching job in January 2015 and began focusing on traveling full-time after that. By October 2015, he had visited a total of 73 countries. He also started a blog called "The Hungry Partier" (later renamed "Drew Binsky") and began documenting his travels on Instagram and Snapchat.

In 2017, his girlfriend, Deanna Sallao, bought him a camera, which prompted him to create and begin posting videos on his YouTube channel (also called "Drew Binsky"). In May 2017, he uploaded a video of an organized trip to North Korea on his YouTube and Facebook channels. The video accumulated over 10 million views. Binsky also began earning money from YouTube and Facebook advertising revenue and sponsored partnerships with various brands. He has over 4 million followers on social media and holds two Guinness World Records: visiting the most UNESCO Heritage sites in a 24-hour period and for quickest suitcase packing. In 2018, he began working from Bangkok, Thailand.

In 2019, Binsky met Zablon Simintov, who was thought to be the only remaining Jew still living in Afghanistan at the time, and featured him in a video that accumulated over 1 million views.

In 2020, Binsky announced an upcoming documentary on his travels called Border 197. He is the Guinness World Record holder for the Most UNESCO World Heritage Sites visited in 24 hours and for the fastest time to pack a suitcase (35.59 seconds).

Binsky's goal was to travel to all 197 countries recognized by the United Nations in the world by the end of 2021. He completed his goal on October 29, 2021 by visiting Saudi Arabia. As of 2021, he has more than 9 million followers on social media with more than 4 billion views of his videos.

Just Go is Binsky's merchandise brand.

Personal life 
Binsky became engaged to Deanna Sallao in May 2021. After graduating college, he had aspirations of becoming a professional golfer. As part of his travels, he plays and reviews golf courses around the world. 

As of 2020, he resided in Arizona.

In 2023, he married his fiancée Deanna Sallao in Balesin Island on Valentine's Day.

References

External links 
 
 Border 197 official website
 

1991 births
American bloggers
20th-century American Jews
American male bloggers
American people of German-Jewish descent
Guinness World Records
Jewish bloggers
Living people
People from Dallas
People from Scottsdale, Arizona
University of Wisconsin–Madison alumni
American video bloggers
YouTube travel vloggers
YouTubers from Texas
21st-century American Jews